Sanhe is a town under the administration of Yingzhou District, Fuyang, Anhui, China. , it has 2 residential communities and 6 villages under its administration.

References 

Township-level divisions of Anhui
Fuyang